Simona Suriano is an Italian politician. She was elected to be a deputy to the Parliament of Italy in the 2018 Italian general election for the Legislature XVIII of Italy.

Career
Suriano was born on July 1, 1978 in Catania.

She was elected to the Italian Parliament in the 2018 Italian general election, to represent the district of Sicily 2 for the Five Star Movement.

References

Living people
Five Star Movement politicians
1978 births
Deputies of Legislature XVIII of Italy
Politicians from Catania
21st-century Italian women politicians
Women members of the Chamber of Deputies (Italy)